Arjun Chaupari is a rural municipality in Syangja District in Gandaki Province, central Nepal. On 12 March 2017, the government of Nepal implemented a new local administrative structure consisting of 744 local units. With the implementation of the new local administrative structure, VDCs have been replaced with municipal & village councils. Arjun Chaupari is one of these 744 local units. Arjun Chaupari is created by merging Rapakot, Aruchaur, Sataudarau & (3,7) Wards of Panchamul.

Political situation
Arjun Chaupari is divided into 6 Wards. It is surrounded by Aandhikhola at northern side, Putalibazar from east, Parbat District from west and Bhirkot Municipality at south. The office of the village council is that of the former Arjun Chaupari.

Population
As Arjun Chaupari is created by merging Rapakot, Aruchaur, Sataudarau & (3,7) Wards of Panchamul. The total population of Arjun Chaupari, 16,176, is residing in an area of 57.22 km2.

References

See also

Syangja District
Rural municipalities in Syangja District
Rural municipalities of Nepal established in 2017